

Events

January–February
 January 26 – Black Saturday in Egypt: Rioters burn Cairo's central business district, targeting British and upper-class Egyptian businesses.
 February 6
 Princess Elizabeth, Duchess of Edinburgh, becomes monarch of the United Kingdom of Great Britain and Northern Ireland and the British Dominions: Canada, Australia, New Zealand, South Africa, Pakistan and Ceylon. The princess, who is on a visit to Kenya when she hears of the death of her father, King George VI, aged 56, takes the regnal name Elizabeth II.
 In the United States, a mechanical heart is used for the first time in a human patient.
 February 14 – February 25 –  The Winter Olympics are held in Oslo, Norway.
 February 15 – The State Funeral of King George VI of the United Kingdom of Great Britain and Northern Ireland and the British Dominions and the last Emperor of India, takes place. George VI's coffin is brought in procession through London to Paddington Station where a royal train brought the King to Windsor, where his funeral and burial took place at St. George's Chapel at Windsor Castle.
 February 18 – Greece and Turkey join the North Atlantic Treaty Organization.
 February 21 – In Dhaka, East Pakistan (present-day Bangladesh) police open fire on a procession of students, killing 4 people and starting a country-wide protest, which leads to the recognition of Bengali as one of the national languages of Pakistan. The day is later declared "International Mother Language Day" by UNESCO.
 February 25 – The Parícutin active volcano in Michoacán, west central Mexico, ceases its discontinuous eruption after spewing forth a gigaton of lava, and burying San Juan Parangaricutiro.
 February 26 – Vincent Massey is sworn in, becoming the first Canadian-born Governor General of Canada.

March–April
 March 10 – General Fulgencio Batista re-takes power in Cuba in a coup.
 March 15 – 16 – 73 inches (1,870 mm) of rain falls in Cilaos, Réunion, the most rainfall in one day up to that time.
 March 20 – The United States Senate ratifies a peace treaty with Japan.
 March 21
 The last two executions in the Netherlands take place.
 Dr. Kwame Nkrumah is elected Prime Minister of the Gold Coast.
 Tornadoes ravage the lower Mississippi River Valley, leaving 208 dead, through March 22.
 March 22 – Wernher von Braun publishes the first in his series of articles titled Man Will Conquer Space Soon!, including ideas for crewed flights to Mars and the Moon.
 March 27
Konrad Adenauer survives an assassination attempt.
A legislative Assembly election is held in Coorg.
 April 4
 In the Hague Tribunal, Israel demands reparations worth $3 billion from Germany.
 West Ice accidents: During a severe storm in the West Ice, east of Greenland, 78 seal hunters on 5 Norwegian seal hunting vessels vanish without a trace.
 April 7 – The American Research Bureau reports that the I Love Lucy episode "The Marriage License" was the first TV show in history to be seen in around 10,000,000 homes, the evening the episode aired.
 April 8 – Youngstown Sheet & Tube Co. v. Sawyer: The U.S. Supreme Court limits the power of the President to seize private business, after President Harry S. Truman nationalizes all steel mills in the United States, just before the 1952 steel strike begins.
 April 9
 Hugo Ballivián's government is overthrown by the Bolivian National Revolution, which starts a period of agrarian reform, universal suffrage and the nationalization of tin mines.
 : 50 people were trampled to death in the Basilica of St. Teresa, Caracas, Venezuela, after someone shouted "Fire!". 40 people were arrested in connection with the crush.
 April 11 
Battle of Nanri Island: The Republic of China seizes the island from the People's Republic of China.
Bolivian National Revolution: Rebels take over Palacio Quemado.
 April 18
 Bolivia National Revolution: A universal vote enables indigenous peoples and women to vote, nationalizes mines and enacts agrarian reform.
 West Germany and Japan form diplomatic relations.
 April 26 – United States Navy aircraft carrier Wasp collides with destroyer Hobson while on exercises in the Atlantic Ocean, killing 175 men.
 April 28 – The Treaty of San Francisco goes into effect, formally ending the war between Japan and the Allies, and simultaneously ending the occupation of the four main Japanese islands by the Supreme Commander for the Allied Powers.

May–June
 May 1 – East Germany threatens to form its own army.
 May 3 – U.S. lieutenant colonels Joseph O. Fletcher and William P. Benedict land a plane at the geographic North Pole.
 May 6 – Farouk of Egypt has himself announced as a descendant of the Islamic prophet, Muhammad.
 May 13 – Pandit Nehru forms his first government in India.
 May 15 – Diplomatic relations are established between Israel and Japan at the level of legations.
 May 18 – Ann Davison becomes the first woman to single-handedly sail the Atlantic Ocean.
 June 1
 The Roman Catholic Church bans the books of André Gide.
 Navigation opens on the Volga–Don Canal, connecting the Caspian Sea basin with that of the Black Sea.
 June 10 - 1952 San Juan earthquake. A magnitude 6.8 earthquake kills 5 people on Argentina's San Juan Province.
 June 13 – "Catalina affair": Soviet MiG-15 fighter planes shoot down a Swedish military Douglas C-47 Skytrain, carrying out signals intelligence gathering operations over the Baltic Sea, killing all 8 crew; three days later they shoot down a Catalina flying boat, searching for possible survivors.
 June 14 – Myxomatosis is introduced to Europe, on the French estate of Dr. Paul-Félix Armand-Delille.
 June 15 – Anne Frank's The Diary of a Young Girl is published in English-language translation.
 June 19 – The Special Forces (United States Army) are created.
 June 26 – The Pan-Malayan Labour Party is founded in Malaya, as a union of statewide labour parties.
 June 27 – Decree 900 in Guatemala orders the redistribution of uncultivated land.
 June 28 – The First Miss Universe pageant is held. Armi Kuusela from Finland wins the title of Miss Universe 1952.

July–August

 July 13 – East Germany announces the formation of its National People's Army.
 July 19 – August 3 – The 1952 Summer Olympics are held in Helsinki, Finland.
 July 21 – The 7.3  Kern County earthquake strikes California's southern Central Valley with a maximum Mercalli intensity of XI (Extreme), killing 12 and injuring hundreds. 
 July 23
 The European Coal and Steel Community is established.
 General Mohammed Naguib leads The Free Officers (formed by Gamal Abdel Nasser – the real power behind the coup) in the overthrow of King Farouk of Egypt.
 July 26 – King Farouk of Egypt abdicates in favour of Fuad II.
 Maria Eva Duarte De Peron known as "Evita" Argentina's first lady dies of cancer. The Argentine government's declaration of national mourning causes all business, entertainment, leisure, and work to a standstill.
 August 5 – The Treaty of Taipei between Japan and the Republic of China goes into effect, to officially end the Second Sino-Japanese War.
 August 11 – The Jordanian Parliament forces King Talal of Jordan to abdicate due to mental illness; he is succeeded by his son King Hussein.
 August 12 – Night of the Murdered Poets: 13 Soviet Jewish poets are executed.
 August 13 – Japan joins the IMF.
 August 14 – West Germany joins the IMF and the World Bank.
 August 16 – Lynmouth, North Devon, England is devastated by floods; 34 die.
 August 18: A 7.5 earthquake shakes the Tibet region leaving a balance of 54 fatalities.
 August 22 – The most damaging aftershock of the 1952 Kern County earthquake sequence strikes with a moment magnitude of 5.8, and a maximum Mercalli intensity of VIII (Severe). This event damages several hundred buildings in Bakersfield, California, with total additional losses of $10 million, with two associated deaths and some injuries.
 August 26 – A British passenger jet makes a return crossing of the Atlantic Ocean in the same day.
 August 27 – Reparation negotiations between West Germany and Israel end in Luxembourg: Germany will pay 3 billion Deutsche Marks.
 August 29 – Composer John Cage's 4′33″, during which the performer does not play, premieres in Woodstock, New York.
 August 30 – The last Finnish war reparations are sent to the Soviet Union.
 August 31 – The Grenzlandring racetrack closes in Wegberg, Germany.

September–October
 September 2 – Dr. C. Walton Lillehei and Dr. F. John Lewis perform the first open-heart surgery, at the University of Minnesota.
 September 6 – The CBC in Montreal, Quebec, goes on air launching television in Canada.
 September 10 – The European Parliamentary Assembly (from March 1962, the European Parliament) opens.
 September 15 – The United Nations cedes Eritrea to Ethiopia.
 September 18 – The Soviet Union vetoes Japan's application for membership in the United Nations.
 September 30 – The Revised Standard Version of the Bible is published.
 October 14 – The United Nations begins work in the new United Nations building in New York City, designed by Le Corbusier and Oscar Niemeyer.
 October 17 – 17 October affair: Indonesian troops led by General Nasution surround the presidential palace, seeking the dismissal of the People's Representative Council; Sukarno avoids confrontation.
 October 19 – Alain Bombard begins to sail from the Canary Islands to Barbados in 65 days; he reaches them December 23.
 October 20 – Martial law is declared in Kenya, in the face of the Mau Mau uprising.

November–December
 November 1 – Nuclear testing and Operation Ivy: The United States successfully detonates the first hydrogen bomb, codenamed "Mike", at Eniwetok Atoll in the Marshall Islands in the central Pacific Ocean, with a yield of 10.4 megatons.

 November 4
 1952 United States presidential election: Republican General Dwight D. Eisenhower defeats Democratic Governor of Illinois Adlai Stevenson (correctly predicted by the UNIVAC computer).
 Pace-Finletter MOU 1952: A Memorandum of understanding is signed between "...Air Force Secretary Finletter and Army Secretary Pace that established a fixed wing weight limit [for the Army] of five thousand pounds empty, but weight restrictions on helicopters were eliminated..."
 November 5 – The 9.0  Severo-Kurilsk earthquake hits the Kamchatka Peninsula of the Soviet Union with a maximum Mercalli intensity of XI (Extreme). A tsunami took the lives of more than 2,300 people.
 November 18 – Jomo Kenyatta is arrested in Kenya, for an alleged connection to the Mau Mau Uprising.
 November 20
 The first official passenger flight over the North Pole is made, from Los Angeles to Copenhagen.
The first successful sex reassignment surgery is performed in Copenhagen on Christine Jorgensen. 
 November 29 – Korean War: U.S. President-elect Dwight D. Eisenhower fulfills a political campaign promise, by traveling to Korea to find out what can be done to end the conflict.
 December 1 – Adolfo Ruiz Cortines takes office as President of Mexico.
 December 10 – Albert Schweitzer is given the 1952 Nobel Peace Prize.
 December 14 – The first successful surgical separation of Siamese twins is conducted in Mount Sinai Hospital, Cleveland, Ohio.
 December 20 – The crash of a U.S. Air Force C-124 Globemaster at Moses Lake, WA kills 86 servicemen.
 December 25 – One West German soldier is killed in a shooting incident in West Berlin.
 December 26 – Joseph Ivor Linton, the first Israeli Minister Plenipotentiary in Japan, presents his credentials to the Emperor of Japan.

Date unknown
 The Nordic Council agrees to the unrestricted transport of people, goods and services throughout the Nordic Countries.
 Supramar launches the first commercial high-speed craft, a hydrofoil.
 During the Mau Mau Uprising, the poisonous latex of the African milk bush is used to kill cattle, in an incident of Biological warfare.

Births

January

 January 1 – Hamad bin Khalifa Al Thani, Emir of Qatar
 January 2 – Elvira Saadi, Soviet gymnast
 January 3 
 Esperanza Aguirre, Spanish politician
 Jim Ross, American wrestling announcer
 January 7 – Sammo Hung, Hong Kong martial arts superstar, producer and director
 January 9 – Marek Belka, 11th Prime Minister of Poland 
 January 9 - Lee Montgomery, American speed shop owner,
 January 12 – Walter Mosley, American author
 January 14 – Călin Popescu-Tăriceanu, 60th Prime Minister of Romania
 January 15
 Boris Blank, Swiss musician
 Muhammad Wakkas, Bangladeshi teacher and parliamentarian
 January 17 – Ryuichi Sakamoto, Japanese musician, composer, producer, and actor (Yellow Magic Orchestra)
 January 21 – Marco Camenisch, Swiss environmental activist
 January 24 – Raymond Domenech, French football player, manager
 January 25
 Sara Mandiano, French singer, songwriter
 Peter Tatchell, Australian-born British human rights activist 
 January 27
 Brian Gottfried, American tennis player
 Asma Jahangir, Pakistani human rights activist, lawyer (d. 2018)
 January 29 – Klaus-Peter Hanisch, German footballer (d. 2009)
 January 30 – Valery Khalilov, Russian military band conductor (d. 2016)

February

 February 2 – Park Geun-hye, President of South Korea
 February 4
 Abdalá Bucaram, 38th President of Ecuador
 Jenny Shipley, Prime Minister of New Zealand
 February 7 – John Hickenlooper, American politician, 42nd Governor of Colorado
 February 8 – Nora Miao, Hong Kong actress
 February 10 – Lee Hsien Loong, 3rd Prime Minister of Singapore
 February 12 – Simon MacCorkindale, English actor (d. 2010)
 February 14 – Sushma Swaraj, Indian politician (d. 2019) 
 February 15 
 Nikolai Sorokin, Soviet, Russian actor, theatre director (d. 2013) 
 Tomislav Nikolić, 4th President of Serbia 
 February 16 – James Ingram, African-American R&B musician (d. 2019)
 February 17 – Javier Urruticoechea, Spanish footballer (d. 2001)
 February 19 
 Gary Seear, New Zealand rugby union player (d. 2018)
 Amy Tan, American novelist (The Joy Luck Club)
 February 21 
 Vitaly Churkin, Russian diplomat (d. 2017)
 Elisha Obed, Bahamian boxer (d. 2018)
 February 22
 William Frist, U.S. Senator, heart surgeon
 Saufatu Sopoanga, 8th Prime Minister of Tuvalu (d. 2020)
 February 25 – Joey Dunlop, Northern Irish motorcycle racer (d. 2000)

March 

 March 2 – Laraine Newman, American comedian (Saturday Night Live)
 March 4 – Umberto Tozzi, Italian singer
 March 7 – Viv Richards, West Indian cricketer
 March 10 – Morgan Tsvangirai, Zimbabwean politician, 2nd Prime Minister of Zimbabwe (d. 2018)
 March 11 – Douglas Adams, English author (The Hitchhiker's Guide to the Galaxy) (d. 2001)
 March 13
 Ágnes Rapai, Hungarian writer
 Wolfgang Rihm, German composer
 March 14 – Martin Dempsey, United States Army general
 March 15 – Howard Devoto, British singer
 March 16 – Alice Hoffman, American novelist
 March 17 – Perla, Paraguayan-Brazilian singer 
 March 18 – Salome Zourabichvili, Georgian politician, 5th President of Georgia
 March 19 – Harvey Weinstein, American film producer 
 March 23
 Kim Stanley Robinson, American author
 Rex Tillerson, United States Secretary of State
 Villano III, Mexican professional wrestler (d. 2018)
 March 24 – Reinhard Genzel, German astrophysicist, Nobel Prize recipient
 March 25
 Jung Chang, Chinese-born author, historian
 Antanas Mockus, Colombian mathematician, politician
 March 26 – Didier Pironi, French racing driver (d. 1987)
 March 27 – Maria Schneider, French actress (d. 2011)
 March 28 – Keith Ashfield, Canadian politician (d. 2018)
 March 29 – 
 Teofilo Stevenson, Cuban boxer (d. 2012)
 Bola Tinubu, Nigerian politician, President-elect of Nigeria
 March 30 – Peter Knights, Australian footballer, coach
 March 31 – Dermot Morgan, Irish actor and comedian (d. 1998)

April 

 

 April 1 
 Annette O'Toole, American actress
 Bernard Stiegler, French philosopher (d. 2020)
 April 2 – Lennart Fagerlund, Swedish cyclist
 April 4
 Rosemarie Ackermann, German athlete
 Gary Moore, Northern Irish musician (d. 2011)
 Karen Magnussen, Canadian figure skater
 April 6 – Marilu Henner, American actress (Taxi) and writer
 April 7 – Nichita Danilov, Romanian writer
 April 10 – Steven Seagal, American actor 
 April 11 – Qamar Zaman, Pakistani squash player
 April 16 – Billy West, American voice actor
 April 17
 Joe Alaskey, American voice actor (d. 2016)
 Željko Ražnatović, Serbian mobster, paramilitary leader (d. 2000)
 April 19 – Alexis Arguello, Nicaraguan boxer, politician (d. 2009)
 April 21 – Cheryl Gillan, British politician (d. 2021)
 April 23 – Jean-Dominique Bauby, French journalist and author (d. 1997)
 April 24 – Jean-Paul Gaultier, French Haute couture, Prêt-à-Porter fashion designer
 April 25 
 Ketil Bjørnstad, Norwegian pianist
 Vladislav Tretiak, Russian ice hockey player
 April 27 – George Gervin, American basketball player
 April 28 – Mary McDonnell, American actress

May 

 May 1 – Mike Thornton, British politician
 May 2 – Christine Baranski, American actress
 May 3
 Leonid Khachiyan, Russian-born mathematician
 Allan Wells, Scottish athlete
 May 4 – Michael Barrymore, British comedian, TV presenter
 May 6 – Michael O'Hare, American actor (d. 2012)
 May 10
 Roland Kaiser, German singer
 Manuel Mora Morales, Spanish director, writer
 May 11
 Shohreh Aghdashloo, Iranian actress
 Frances Fisher, British-born American actress
 Renaud, French composer
 May 12 – Christopher Gaze, British voice actor
 May 13 – John Kasich, Governor of Ohio
 May 14
 Robert Zemeckis, American film director (Back to the Future)
 David Byrne, Scottish singer-songwriter (Talking Heads)
 May 15 – Chazz Palminteri, American actor
 May 18 – George Strait, American country musician
 May 19 – Bert van Marwijk, Dutch football manager
 May 20
 Bernard Kennedy, Irish psychoanalyst, poet, and priest
 Roger Milla, Cameroonian footballer
 May 21 – Mr. T, African-American actor (The A-Team)
 May 23 – Anne-Marie David, French singer, Eurovision Song Contest 1973 winner
 May 24 – Sybil Danning, Austrian actress

June 

 June 4 – Bronisław Komorowski, President of Poland
 June 6 
 Marsha Blackburn, American politician and businesswoman
 Yukihiro Takahashi, Japanese drummer and singer (d. 2023)
 June 7
 Hubert Auriol, French racing driver (d. 2021)
 Liam Neeson, Northern Irish actor (Schindler's List)
 Orhan Pamuk, Turkish writer, Nobel Prize winner
 June 14 – Pat Summitt, American basketball coach (d. 2016)
 June 16
 George Papandreou, Greek politician
 Gino Vannelli, Canadian singer, songwriter
 June 17
 Sergio Marchionne, Italian-Canadian executive (d. 2018)
 Sarbjit Singh Chadha, Indian enka singer
 June 18
 Idriss Déby Itno, President of Chad (d. 2021)
 Carol Kane, American actress 
 Isabella Rossellini, Italian model, actress
 June 20
 John Goodman, American actor 
 Vikram Seth, Indian novelist
 June 21
 Jeremy Coney, New Zealand cricket captain
 Marcella Detroit, American singer (Shakespears Sister)
 June 22
 Franco Cucinotta, Italian professional footballer
 Graham Greene, Canadian actor
 Alastair Stewart, British newsreader
 Santokh Singh, Malaysian footballer
 June 23 – Peter Whiteside, British modern pentathlete
 June 24
 Ladislas Lozano, French-Spanish football coach, retired player
 Stephen Pusey, British-born artist
 June 25
 Péter Erdő, Hungarian cardinal
 Tim Finn, New Zealand singer, songwriter
 June 28 – Pietro Mennea, Italian athlete (d. 2013)
 June 29 – Joe Johnson, English snooker player
 June 30 – Stein Olav Hestad, Norwegian footballer

July 

 

 July 1 
 Brian George, Israeli-English actor, voice artist, comedian and singer
 Dan Aykroyd, Canadian actor, comedian (Saturday Night Live)
 Dale Hayes, South African professional golfer
 July 2
 Linda M. Godwin, American scientist
 Ahmed Ouyahia, Algerian politician
 Marco Piccinini, Monegasque sport personality, businessman, and politician
 July 3
 Laura Branigan, American singer, actress ("Self Control") (d. 2004)
 Lu Colombo, Italian singer
 Andy Fraser, English musician (d. 2015)
 Rohinton Mistry, Indian writer
 July 4
 Álvaro Uribe, President of Colombia
 John Waite, English singer, musician
 July 6 
 Adi Shamir, Israeli cryptographer
 Ani Yudhoyono, 6th First Lady of Indonesia (d. 2019)
 Kim Chul-soo, South Korean footballer
 July 7
 Li Hongzhi, Chinese-American founder, spiritual leader of Falun Gong
 Alain Cortes, French modern pentathlete
 July 8
 Ahmed Nazif, Prime Minister of Egypt
 Knud Arne Jürgensen, Danish music, theater and ballet historian
 July 10 
 Evelio Leonardia, Filipino politician
 Anam Ramanarayana Reddy, Indian politician
 July 11 – Stephen Lang, American actor
 July 12
 Irina Bokova, Bulgarian diplomat and civil servant
 Voja Antonić, Serbian inventor, writer
 Liz Mitchell, Jamaican-born singer (Boney M.)
 July 13 – Ricardo Boechat, Argentine-Brazilian journalist, anchor and radio announcer (d. 2019)
 July 15
 Yuriko Koike, Japanese politician (Governor of Tokyo)
 Terry O'Quinn, American actor
 Marky Ramone, American musician
 July 16 – Stewart Copeland, American rock musician (The Police)
 July 17 – David Hasselhoff, American actor (Knight Rider)
 July 18 – Albert Camille Vital, Malagasy Army officer, politician and civil engineer
 July 19 – Allen Collins, American rock musician (Lynyrd Skynyrd) (d. 1990)
 July 21 – Ahmad Husni Hanadzlah, Malaysian Minister of Finance
 July 24
 Kamrul Hasan Bhuiyan, Bangladeshi military officer, writer (d. 2018)
 Gus Van Sant, American film director
 July 25 – Eduardo Souto de Moura, Portuguese Architect
 July 26 — Hezi Leskali, Israeli poet and artist (d. 1994)
 July 28 – Vajiralongkorn, King of Thailand (Rama X)
 July 31 – João Barreiros, Portuguese author

August 

 August 1 – Zoran Đinđić, Serbian politician (d. 2003)
 August 3 – Osvaldo Ardiles, Argentine footballer
 August 4 
 Estanislau da Silva, East Timorese politician
 Moya Brennan, Irish singer
 August 5
 Hun Sen, Prime Minister of Cambodia 
 Louis Walsh, Irish music producer, reality TV show judge
 August 6 – Wojciech Fortuna, Polish ski jumper
 August 8 – Jostein Gaarder, Norwegian author
 August 12 – Charlie Whiting, British motorsports director (d. 2019)
 August 14 – Jeanette Oppenheim, Danish lawyer and politician
 August 16 – Reginald VelJohnson, American actor
 August 17 – Guillermo Vilas, Argentine tennis player
 August 18 – Patrick Swayze, American actor and dancer (d. 2009)
 August 19 – Jonathan Frakes, American actor (Star Trek: The Next Generation)
 August 21
 Joe Strummer, British rock musician (The Clash) (d. 2002)
 Jiří Paroubek, 6th Prime Minister of the Czech Republic
 August 24 – Linton Kwesi Johnson, Jamaican-born musician, poet
 August 25 – Charles M. Rice, American virologist, Nobel Prize recipient
 August 26
 Bryon Baltimore, Canadian ice hockey player
 Michael Jeter, American film, stage, and television actor (d. 2003)
 August 27 – Paul Reubens,  American actor, writer and comedian (Pee-Wee Herman)
 August 28 
 Rita Dove, American poet (1987 Pulitzer Prize, United States Poet Laureate 1993–95)
 Wendelin Wiedeking, German businessman
 August 31 
 Eli Gorenstein, Israeli actor, voice actor and cellist
 Hilary Farr, British-Canadian actress, designer

September 

September 2
 Jimmy Connors, American tennis player
 Yuen Wah – Hong Kong martial actor
 September 4 – Rishi Kapoor, Indian actor (d. 2020)
 September 6 – Lucky Enam, Bangladeshi actress
 September 8 – Patrick Prosser, Scottish computer scientist
 September 10 – Paulo Betti, Brazilian actor
 September 12
 Sergey Karaganov, Russian political scientist
 Neil Peart, Canadian rock drummer (Rush) (d. 2020)
 September 16 
 Karen Muir, South African swimmer (d. 2013)
 Fatos Nano, Albanian prime minister
 Mickey Rourke, American film actor, former boxer
 September 17 – Harold Solomon, American tennis player
 September 18 – Nile Rodgers, African-American musician, songwriter, composer, and guitarist
 September 20 – Manuel Zelaya, President of Honduras
 September 21 – Anneliese Michel, German Roman Catholic believed possessed by demons (d. 1976)
 September 22 – Oliver Mtukudzi, Zimbabwean musician (d. 2019)
 September 25 – Christopher Reeve, American actor, activist (Superman) (d. 2004)
 September 26 – Predrag Miletić, Serbian actor
 September 27 – Didier Dubois, French mathematician
 September 28 – Sylvia Kristel, Dutch actress (d. 2012)
 September 30 – Jack Wild, English actor (H.R. Pufnstuf) (d. 2006)

October 

 October 5
 Clive Barker, British author
 Harold Faltermeyer, German musician
 Imran Khan, Prime Minister of Pakistan
 Emomali Rahmon, President of Tajikistan
 Duncan Regehr, Canadian actor
 October 6 – Matthew Sweeney, Irish poet (d. 2018)
 October 7
 Ivo Gregurević, Croatian actor (d. 2019)
 Mary Badham, American actress
 Vladimir Putin, President of Russia
 Ludmilla Tourischeva, Soviet gymnast
 October 9 – Sharon Osbourne, English actress, TV host and author
 October 12 – Advent Bangun, Indonesian karateka, actor (d. 2018)
 October 13 – John Lone, Hong Kong actor
 October 14 
 Kaija Saariaho, Finnish composer
 Nikolai Andrianov, Soviet gymnast (d. 2011)
 Harry Anderson, American actor, comedian and magician (d. 2018)
 October 18 – Chuck Lorre, American sitcom creator
 October 19 – Verónica Castro, Mexican actress, entertainer
 October 20 – Eliane Giardini, Brazilian actress
 October 22 – Jeff Goldblum, American actor
 October 23 – Steven Tandy, Australian stage, television and film actor
 October 24 – David Weber, American science-fiction, fantasy author
 October 26 – Andrew Motion, English poet
 October 27 
 Roberto Benigni, Italian actor, screenwriter, and film director
 Hazell Dean, British pop, dance musician
 Francis Fukuyama, American political scientist
 Topi Sorsakoski, Finnish singer
 October 28 – Annie Potts, American actress

November

 November 3
 David Ho, Taiwanese-American AIDS researcher
 Michael Shea, American child actor
 Roseanne Barr, American actress, comedian (Roseanne)
 Jim Cummings, American voice actor
 November 4 – Jeff Lorber, American jazz keyboardist, composer and record producer
 November 5
 Oleh Blokhin, Ukrainian football player and manager
 Brian Muehl, American puppeteer
 Bill Walton, American basketball player, commentator
 November 6 – Michael Cunningham, American writer
 November 7
 Geraldo Alckmin, Brazilian politician 
 David Petraeus, American general
 November 8
 Jan Raas, Dutch professional cyclist
 Alfre Woodard, African-American actress, producer and political activist
 November 9 – Gladys Requena, Venezuelan politician
 November 13 – Art Malik, Pakistani-born British actor
 November 14 – Maggie Roswell, American actress
 November 15 – Randy Savage, American professional wrestler (d. 2011)
 November 16 – Shigeru Miyamoto, Japanese game designer
 November 17
 Ties Kruize, Dutch field hockey player
 Cyril Ramaphosa, President of South Africa
 November 18 – John Parr, English singer, songwriter and guitarist
 November 23 – Sharon O'Neill, New Zealand singer-songwriter and pianist
 November 24 – Ilja Richter, German actor, voice actor, television presenter, singer and author
 November 28 – S. Epatha Merkerson, African-American actress (Law and Order) 
 November 29 – John D. Barrow, English cosmologist, theoretical physicist and mathematician (d. 2020)
 November 30 – Mandy Patinkin, American actor and singer

December 

 December 1
 Rick Scott, American politician, 45th Governor of Florida, U.S. Senator (Florida)
 Pegi Young, American singer, songwriter, educator, and philanthropist (d. 2019)
 December 3 
 Bruno Jonas, German Kabarett artist, actor
 Mel Smith, British comedian (d. 2013)
 Wan Azizah Wan Ismail, Malaysian politician
 December 6
 Nicolas Bréhal, French novelist, literary critic
 Edward Etzel, American Olympic shooter
 Christian Kulik, Polish football player
 December 8 - Khaw Boon Wan, Singaporean politician
 December 9 – Michael Dorn, African-American actor (Star Trek: The Next Generation)
 December 12
 Harbance Singh (Herb) Dhaliwal, Canadian politician
 Sarah Douglas, English actress
 December 15
 Julie Taymor, American film, stage and opera director, costume designer
 Hwang Woo-suk, South Korean biomedical scientist
 Allan Simonsen, Danish footballer and coach
 December 16 – Joel Garner, West Indian cricketer
 December 20
 Jenny Agutter, English actress
 Faisal Al-Fayez, Prime Minister of Jordan
 December 25 – Youssouf Ouédraogo, 6th Prime Minister of Burkina Faso (d. 2017)
 December 26 – Riki Sorsa, Finnish singer (d. 2016)
 December 27
 David Knopfler, British musician
 Tovah Feldshuh, American actress
 December 28 – Arun Jaitley, Indian politician (d. 2019)
 December 29 – Külliki Saldre, Estonian actress
 December 30 – June Anderson, American soprano

Deaths

January

 January 1 – Henri Albert Hartmann, French surgeon (b. 1860)
 January 2 – Gustave Francq, Canadian typographer and trade unionist (b. 1871)
 January 4 – Constant Permeke, Belgian painter (b. 1886)
 January 5 – Hristo Tatarchev, Bulgarian revolutionary (b. 1869)
 January 6 – Sofoklis Dousmanis, Greek naval officer (b. 1868)
 January 8 – Antonia Maury, American astronomer (b. 1866)
 January 9 – Andrea Cassulo, Italian Roman Catholic priest and missionary (b. 1869)
 January 11
 Stanisław Stempowski, Polish politician (b. 1870)
 Jean de Lattre de Tassigny, French general, posthumous Marshal of France (b. 1889)
 January 14 – Almas Ildyrym, Soviet poet (b. 1907)
 January 16 – Paolo Grilli, Italian sculptor and painter (b. 1857)
 January 18 – Curly Howard, American actor and comedian (The Three Stooges) (b. 1903)
 January 19 – Archduke Maximilian Eugen of Austria (b. 1895)
 January 22 – Andrés Luna de San Pedro, Filipino architect (b. 1887)
 January 24 – Duke York, American actor (b. 1908)
 January 25 
 Sveinn Björnsson, 1st President of Iceland (b. 1881)
 François Gagnepain, French botanist (b. 1866)
 Polly Moran, American actress (b. 1883)
 January 26
 Zubeida Begum, Indian actress (b. 1926)
 André Cheron, American actor (b. 1880)
 Khorloogiin Choibalsan, Marshal of the Mongolian People's Republic, Prime Minister of the Mongolian People's Republic (b. 1895)
 January 27 – Fannie Ward, American actress (b. 1872)
 January 28
 Thomas Hicks, American runner (b. 1876)
 Nicolae Constantin Batzaria, Ottoman statesman, Romanian writer (b. 1874)
 January 31
 Nesaruddin Ahmad, Bengali Islamic scholar (b. 1873)

February

 February 2 
 João Guilherme Fischer, Brazilian diplomat and scientist (b. 1876)
 Charles de Rochefort, French actor (b. 1879)
 Patriarch Callistratus of Georgia (b. 1866)
 February 3 – Harold L. Ickes, United States Secretary of the Interior (b. 1874)
 February 4 – Federico Henríquez y Carvajal, Dominican writer (b. 1848)
 February 6 – King George VI of the United Kingdom (b. 1895)
 February 7
 Sebastião da Gama, Portuguese poet (b. 1924)
 Philip G. Epstein, American screenwriter (b. 1909)
 Pete Henry, American football player (Canton Bulldogs) and a member of the Pro Football Hall of Fame (b. 1897)
 February 9 – Arthur Hayes-Sadler, British admiral (b. 1865)
 February 11 – Matija Murko, Yugoslav scholar (b. 1861)
 February 14
 Molly Malone, American actress (b. 1888)
 John Sheehan, American actor (b. 1885)
 February 15 – Enzo de Muro Lomanto, Italian tenor (b. 1902)
 February 17 – Edvige Carboni, Italian Roman Catholic laywoman, mystic and venerable (b. 1880)
 February 18 – Enrique Jardiel Poncela, Spanish playwright and novelist (b. 1901)
 February 19
 Lawrence Grant, British actor (b. 1870)
 Knut Hamsun, Norwegian author, Nobel Prize laureate (b. 1859)
 February 20 – Carlos Julio Arosemena Tola, 28th President of Ecuador (b. 1888)
 February 21 – Francis Xavier Ford, American Roman Catholic bishop, missionary, servant of God and reverend (b. 1892)
 February 24 – Tadeusz Vetulani, Polish agriculturalist (b. 1897)
 February 26
 Theodoros Pangalos, Greek general and politician, dictator and President of Greece (b. 1878)
 Josef Thorak, Austrian-born German sculptor (b. 1889)
 February 27 – Helena Concannon, Irish historian, writer, scholar and politician (b. 1878)
February 28 - Albert Forster, Gauleiter of Danzig during WW2 executed for war crimes (b. 1902)
 February 29 – Quo Tai-chi, Chinese diplomat (b. 1888)

March

 March 1 
 Masao Kume, Japanese playwright, novelist and poet (b. 1891)
 Gregory La Cava, American film director (b. 1892)
 March 2 – Ole E. Benson, American politician (b. 1866)
 March 3 – Antonieta de Barros, Brazilian journalist and politician (b. 1901)
 March 5 – Sir Charles Sherrington, British physiologist, Nobel Prize laureate (b. 1857)
 March 7 – Paramahansa Yogananda, Indian guru (b. 1893)
 March 9 – Alexandra Kollontai, Russian revolutionary (b. 1872)
 March 12 
 Hugh Herbert, American actor and comedian (b. 1887)
 Duke Siegfried August in Bavaria (b. 1876)
 March 13 – Võ Thị Sáu, Vietnamese schoolgirl (b. 1933)
 March 18 – Isaak Mazepa, Soviet politician (b. 1884)
 March 19 – Robert Guérin, French administrator, 1st President of FIFA (b. 1876)
 March 21 – Andries Jan Pieters, Dutch criminal (b. 1916)
 March 22
 Uncle Dave Macon, American musician (b. 1870)
 D. S. Senanayake, 1st Prime Minister of Ceylon (b. 1884)
 March 26 – J.P. McGowan, Australian actor and director (b. 1880)
 March 28 – Sir Fraser Russell, Governor of Southern Rhodesia (b. 1876)
 March 30 – Sir Jigme Wangchuck, King of Bhutan (b. 1905)
 March 31
 Bo McMillin, American football player and coach (b. 1895)
 Walter Schellenberg, German Nazi intelligence official (b. 1910)
 Roland West, American film director (b. 1885)
 Wallace H. White, Jr., U.S. Senator from Maine (b. 1877)

April
 April 1 – Ferenc Molnár, Hungarian novelist and dramatist (b. 1878)
 April 2 
 Antonio Cortis, Spanish tenor (b. 1891)
 Julio Enrique Moreno, acting President of Ecuador (b. 1879)
 April 3 – Miina Sillanpää, Finnish politician (b. 1866)
 April 5 
 Charles Collett, British chief mechanical engineer (Great Western Railway) (b. 1871)
 Sir John Tilley, British diplomat (b. 1869)
 April 8 – Tadeusz Estreicher, Polish cryogenics pioneer (b. 1871)
 April 10 – Frederic Austin, British teacher and composer (b. 1872)
 April 15 
 Bruno Barilli, Italian actor and composer (b. 1880)
 Viktor Chernov, Russian revolutionary, leader of the Russian Socialist Revolutionary Party (b. 1873)
 April 19 – Steve Conway, British singer (b. 1921)
April 21
 Leslie Banks, British actor (b. 1890)
 Sir Stafford Cripps, British Labour politician, former Chancellor of the Exchequer (b. 1889)
 April 23
 Nikolai Alekseev, Russian-born Greek Orthodox priest and saint (b. 1869)
 Julius Freed, American inventor and banker (b. 1887)
 April 27 – Guido Castelnuovo, Italian mathematician (b. 1865)
 April 29 – Manuel Portela Valladares, Spanish political figure (b. 1868)
 April 30 – Shigenori Kuroda, Japanese general (b. 1887)

May

 May 2 
 Lagertha Broch, Norwegian illustrator (b. 1864)
 Matrona Nikonova, Soviet Orthodox nun and saint (b. 1881)
 May 3 – Juan Carlos Blanco Acevedo, Uruguayan politician (b. 1879)
 May 5 – Alberto Savinio, Italian writer (b. 1891)
 May 6 – Maria Montessori, Italian educator (b. 1870)
 May 7 – Juan Bautista Pérez, Venezuelan lawyer, magistrate and politician, 43rd President of Venezuela (b. 1869)
 May 8 – William Fox, Austro-Hungarian-born film producer (b. 1879)
 May 9 – Canada Lee, American actor (b. 1907)
 May 10 
 Clark L. Hull, American psychologist (b. 1884)
 Gino Boccasile, Italian illustrator (b. 1901)
 May 11 – Giovanni Tebaldini, Italian composer (b. 1864)
 May 15 
 Albert Bassermann, German actor (b. 1867)
 Tadeusz Breyer, Polish sculptor (b. 1874)
 Italo Montemezzi, Italian composer (b. 1875)
 May 16 – Antonio Correa Cotto, Puerto Rican outlaw (b. 1926)
 May 18 – Masakazu Nakai, Japanese aesthetician (b. 1900)
 May 19
 Luigi Fabris, Italian sculptor (b. 1883)
 Bangalore Nagarathnamma, Indian singer (b. 1878)
 May 21 – John Garfield, American actor (b. 1913)
 May 22 – Peter Ermakov, Russian Bolshevik leader (b. 1884)
 May 23 – Georg Schumann, German composer (b. 1866)
 May 29 – Mykhailo Omelianovych-Pavlenko, Ukrainian army officer (b. 1878)

June

 June 1
 John Dewey, American philosopher (b. 1859)
 Malcolm St. Clair, American filmmaker (b. 1897)
 June 6 – Thomas Walsh, American Roman Catholic archbishop and reverend (b. 1873)
 June 8 – Sergey Merkurov, Soviet sculptor (b. 1881)
 June 9 
 Félix Pérez Cardozo, Paraguayan musician (b. 1908)
 Luigi Puccianti, Italian physicist (b. 1875)
 June 10 
 Hilda Hongell, Finnish architect (b. 1867)
 Frances Theodora Parsons, American naturalist (b. 1861)
 June 12
Oleksiy Bazyuk, Bosnian Greek-Catholic hierarch (b. 1873)
Genovevo de la O, Mexican revolutionary leader (b. 1876)
 Michael von Faulhaber, German Cardinal Archbishop of Munich (b. 1869)
 June 13 – Emma Eames, American soprano (b. 1865)
 June 14 – Felix Calonder, Swiss politician, 36th President of the Swiss Confederation (b. 1863)
 June 15 
 Zofia Kirkor-Kiedroniowa, Polish activist (b. 1872)
 Krystyna Skarbek (aka Christine Granville), Polish-born British SOE operative during World War II (b. 1908)
 June 17 – Jack Parsons, American rocket engineer (b. 1914)
 June 18 – Heinrich Schlusnus, German baritone (b. 1888)
 June 24 – Sir George Pearce, Australian politician (b. 1870)
 June 26 – Theodor Becker, German actor (b. 1880)
 June 27 – Elmo Lincoln, American actor (b. 1889)
 June 30 – Eugenio de Liguoro, Italian actor and director (b. 1899)

July

 July 2 – Ciro Grassi, Italian composer (b. 1868)
 July 3 – Carl Tanzler, German-born radiology technologist (b. 1877)
 July 4 – Walter Long, American actor (b. 1879)
 July 5 – Alison Skipworth, British actress (b. 1863)
 July 10 – Rued Langgaard, Danish composer and organist (b. 1893) 
 July 20 – Isabelle LaMal, American actress (b. 1886)
 July 21 
 Catherine Chisholm, British physician (b. 1878)
 Pedro Lascuráin, Mexican diplomat, 34th President of Mexico (b. 1856)
 July 22 
 Harry Carter, American actor (b. 1879)
 Antonio María Valencia, Colombian composer (b. 1902)
 July 24 – Henry Hallett, British actor (b. 1888)
 July 26 
 Edward Ellis, American actor (b. 1870)
 Eva Perón, Argentine political leader, and First Lady to and partner in power of President Juan Perón (b. 1919)
 July 29 – Guillermo Tritschler y Córdova, Mexican Roman Catholic prelate, reverend and servant of God (b. 1878)
 July 31 
 Waldemar Bonsels, German writer (b. 1880)
 Takashi Hishikari, Japanese general (b. 1871)

August

 August 1 – Andrew Higgins, American boatbuilder and industrialist (b. 1886)
 August 2 – J. Farrell MacDonald, American actor and director (b. 1875)
 August 5 – Sameera Moussa, Egyptian nuclear scientist (b. 1917)
 August 6 
Betty Allan, Australian statistician and biometrician (b. 1905)
Francis Pegahmagabow, Canadian military officer (b. 1889)
 August 11 
 Riccardo Martin, American tenor (b. 1874)
 Dave Sands, Australian boxer (b. 1926)
 August 12 – Peretz Markish, Soviet-born Israeli poet (b. 1895)
 August 15 – Armida Barelli, Italian Roman Catholic laywoman and venerable (b. 1882)
 August 18 
 Alberto Hurtado, Chilean Jesuit priest and saint (b. 1901)
 Ralph Byrd, American actor (b. 1909)
 August 22 – Hiranuma Kiichirō, Japanese politician, 24th Prime Minister of Japan (b. 1867)
 August 23 – Henri Coutière, French zoologist (b. 1869)
 August 26 – Giovanni Cazzani, Italian Roman Catholic archbishop and servant of God (b. 1867)
 August 29 
 Euphrasia Eluvathingal, Indian Carmelite nun and saint (b. 1877)
 Anton Piëch, Austrian lawyer, son-in-law of Ferdinand Porsche (b. 1894)
 August 30 – Arky Vaughan, American baseball player (Pittsburgh Pirates) and a member of the MLB Hall of Fame (b. 1912)
 August 31 – Henri Bourassa, Canadian political leader and publisher (b. 1868)

September

 September 4
 Wilhelmus Zakaria Johannes, Indonesian doctor (b. 1895)
 Józef Węgrzyn, Polish actor (b. 1884)
 September 5 – Fernando Luis García, American marine (killed in action) (b. 1929)
 September 6 
 José Vicente de Freitas, Portuguese military officer and politician, 98th Prime Minister of Portugal (b. 1869)
 Gertrude Lawrence, English actress (b. 1898)
 September 7 – Maria Shkapskaya, Soviet poet (b. 1891)
 September 9
 Lizinka Dyrssen, Swedish activist (b. 1866)
 Jonas H. Ingram, American admiral (b. 1886)
 September 13 – Hermann Hummel, German chemist and politician (b. 1876)
 September 14 – Larry Mann, American racing driver (b. 1930)
 September 16 – Hugo Raudsepp, Estonian playwright (b. 1883)
 September 19 – Maria Matos, Portuguese actress (b. 1886)
 September 22 – Kaarlo Juho Ståhlberg, Finnish jurist and academic, 1st President of Finland (b. 1865)
 September 23 – Ray Mala, American actor (b. 1906)
 September 24 – Eiichi Sugimoto, Japanese economist (b. 1901)
 September 26 – George Santayana, Spanish writer (b. 1863)
 September 30 – Waldorf Astor, 2nd Viscount Astor, American businessman and politician (b. 1879)

October

 October 3 – Zavel Kwartin, Soviet-born Israeli composer (b. 1874)
 October 4 
 Sir Keith Murdoch, Australian journalist (b. 1885)
 Sylvia Beach, American publisher (b. 1887)
 October 8 – Arturo Rawson, Argentine military officer and politician, 26th President of Argentina (b. 1885)
 October 11 – Jack Conway, American film producer and director (b. 1887)
 October 13 – Margaret Crosfield, British palaeontologist and geologist (b. 1859)
 October 19 
Edward S. Curtis, American photographer, ethnologist, and film director (b. 1868)
 Huang Jiguang, Chinese soldier (b. 1931)
 Ernst Streeruwitz, Austrian businessman and politician, 6th Chancellor of Austria (b. 1874)
 October 20 – Basil Radford, British actor (b. 1897)
 October 21 – Leonardo Ruiz Pineda, Venezuela lawyer and politician (b. 1916)
 October 22 – Ernst Rüdin, Swiss psychiatrist, geneticist, and eugenicist (b. 1874)
 October 23 – Susan Peters, American actress (b. 1921)
 October 24 – Frederick Jacobi, American composer (b. 1891)
 October 25 – Sergei Bortkiewicz, Soviet Romantic composer and pianist (b. 1877)
 October 26 
 Hattie McDaniel, American actress (b. 1893)
 Myrtle McAteer, American tennis player (b. 1878)
 Henri Rouvière, French anatomist (b. 1876)
 October 27 – Ludwig Fahrenkrog, German writer, playwright and artist (b. 1867)
 October 28 – Billy Hughes, Australian politician, 7th Prime Minister of Australia (b. 1862)

November

 November 1 – Dixie Lee, American singer (b. 1911)
 November 2 
 Mehmet Esat Bülkat, Ottoman general (b. 1862)
 Henry Edwards, British actor (b. 1882)
 November 3 – Louis Verneuil, French playwright and screenwriter (b. 1893)
 November 6 – Charles de Chambrun, French diplomat and writer (b. 1875)
 November 8
 Harold Innis, Canadian communications scholar (b. 1894)
 Hugh Prosser, American actor (b. 1900)
 November 9 – Chaim Weizmann, Jewish biochemist, Zionist leader and Israeli statesman, 1st President of Israel (b. 1874)
 November 10 – John Roche, American actor (b. 1893)
 November 11
 Eugene Bossilkov, Bulgarian Roman Catholic priest, bishop, martyr and blessed (b. 1900)
 Josaphat Chichkov, Bulgarian Orthodox priest, martyr and blessed (b. 1884)
 Kamen Vitchev, Bulgarian Orthodox and Assumptionist priest, martyr and blessed (b. 1893)
 November 15 
 Vasyl Krychevsky, Ukrainian painter (b. 1873)
 Vincent Scotto, French composer (b. 1874)
 November 18 – Paul Eluard, French poet (b. 1895)
 November 20 – Benedetto Croce, Italian critic, philosopher, and politician (b. 1866)
 November 21
 William Green, American labor leader (b. 1873)
 Henriette Roland Holst, Dutch poet and socialist (b. 1869)
 William D. Upshaw, American temperance movement leader (b. 1866)
 November 22 - Otto Dietrich, Nazi SS General (b. 1897)  
 November 25 – Antonio Guarnieri, Italian conductor (b. 1880)
 November 26
 Sven Hedin, Swedish explorer, geographer and geopolitician (b. 1865)
 Carlo Lazzarini, Australian politician (b. 1880)
 November 27 – Zhou Xuechang, Chinese politician (b. 1898)
 November 28 – Elena of Montenegro, Queen of Italy, consort of Victor Emmanuel III (b. 1869)
 November 29
 Vladimir Ipatieff, Soviet chemist (b. 1867)
 Vida Milholland, American activist (b. 1888)
 November 29 – Barbu Alinescu, Romanian general (b. 1890)

December

 December 1 – Vittorio Emanuele Orlando, Italian statesman, 23rd Prime Minister of Italy (b. 1860)
 December 2 – Miguel Osório de Almeida, Brazilian physician and scientist (b. 1890)
 December 3 – Vladimír Clementis, Czechoslovak minister, politician, publicist, literary critic and author (b. 1902)
 December 4 
 Giuseppe Antonio Borgese, Italian writer and journalist (b. 1882)
 Karen Horney, German psychoanalyst (b. 1885)
 December 6 
 Andrey Aleksandrovich Gershun, Soviet physicist (b. 1903)
 Louis Lapicque, French neuroscientist (b. 1866)
 Dumitru Popovici, Romanian historian (b. 1902)
 December 8 – Charles Lightoller, British merchant marine officer, second officer of RMS Titanic (b. 1874)
 December 12 
 Erika Aittamaa, Swedish artisan (b. 1866)
 Billy Cook, American criminal (b. 1928)
 Bedrich Hrozný, Czech orientalist and linguist (b. 1879)
 December 14
 Teixeira de Pascoaes, Portuguese poet, recipient of the Nobel Prize in Literature (b. 1877)
 Fartein Valen, Norwegian composer (b. 1887)
 December 15 
 Goscombe John, British sculptor (b. 1860)
 Emmanuel Boleslaus Ledvina, American Roman Catholic prelate, bishop and reverend (b. 1868)
 December 16 – Leonid Yachenin, Soviet politician (b. 1897)
 December 18 
 Garimella Satyanarayana, Indian poet (b. 1893)
 Ernst Stromer, German paleontologist (b. 1871)
 December 19 – Pehr G. Holmes, American politician (b. 1881)
 December 25 
 Bernardino Molinari, Italian conductor (b. 1880)
 Herman Sörgel, German architect (b. 1885)
 December 26 – Lyn Harding, British actor (b. 1867)
 December 27 – Henri Winkelman, Dutch general (b. 1876)
 December 28
 Carlo Agostini, Italian Roman Catholic prelate and reverend (b. 1871)
 Alexandrine of Mecklenburg-Schwerin, Queen consort of Christian X of Denmark (b. 1879)
 December 29 – Fletcher Henderson, American musician (b. 1897)
 December 30
 Luke McNamee, American admiral and Governor of Guam (b. 1871)
 Gabriel Skagestad, Norwegian theologian, Roman Catholic priest, bishop and reverend (b. 1879)

Nobel Prizes

 Physics – Felix Bloch, Edward Mills Purcell
 Chemistry – Archer John Porter Martin, Richard Laurence Millington Synge
 Medicine – Selman Abraham Waksman
 Literature – François Mauriac
 Peace – Albert Schweitzer

References 

 
Leap years in the Gregorian calendar